Christiaan van Lennep (3 January 1887 – 5 December 1955) was a Dutch tennis player and multiple Dutch champion.

He won the singles title at the Dutch National Tennis Championships in 1905, 1907, 1919, 1921, 1925 and 1926. He was also a seven times doubles champion.

Van Lennep participated in the singles and doubles events at the 1908 and 1924 Olympics. His best result was reaching the third round in the singles event at the 1924 Olympics in Paris. In the third round he lost to American Watson Washburn by three sets to one. He reached the final of the singles event at the inaugural British Hard Court Championships, played in Torquay in April 1924, in which he was defeated by Randolph Lycett in four sets.

He was more successful in international doubles competitions as he reached the semifinal of the 1926 Wimbledon Championships partnering Béla von Kehrling.

Van Lennep played in 12 ties for the Dutch Davis Cup team between 1920 and 1928 and has a won-loss record of 14 to 12.

Ancestry

References

External links
 
 
 
 

1887 births
1955 deaths
19th-century male tennis players
Dutch male tennis players
Olympic tennis players of the Netherlands
Tennis players at the 1908 Summer Olympics
Tennis players at the 1924 Summer Olympics
Sportspeople from Hilversum